The Lot Radio is an online radio station founded by Francois Vaxelaire in Brooklyn, New York. It is operated by Vaxelaire and Pauline Le Mell. The station is based in a shipping container in Williamsburg. Notable guests include Four Tet, Busy P, Floating Points, Hot Chip, Ellen Allien, Fred P, Louie Vega, Jennifer Cardini, Ben UFO, Octo Octa and Eris Drew, Moxie, Nina Kraviz, Falty DL, Kim Ann Foxman, Perel, members of the collective Discwoman and many others. Each broadcast features live DJ sets  with an emphasis on electronic music, disco, and soul music. Broadcasts are archived on lot radio's Mixcloud.

Team 
In addition to founder/owner Francois Vaxelaire, the station is run by Pauline Le Mell, who acts as "station manager, director of programming, coordinator of daily operations, social media manager, event producer, and catch-all liaison for everyone from labels to artists.", and programme directors Chris Cherry and Lloyd Harris.

Awards 
The Lot Radio was Winner of Best Online Radio Station, North America in 2016.

References

External links 
 Official website
 Mixcloud page

Internet radio stations in the United States
Nightlife in Brooklyn